Kogarah is a suburb of Southern Sydney, in the state of New South Wales, Australia. Kogarah is located 14 kilometres (9 miles) south-west of the Sydney central business district and is considered to be the centre of the St George area.

Location
Kogarah took its name from Kogarah Bay, a small bay on the northern shore of the Georges River. The suburb originally stretched to the bay but has since been divided up to form the separate suburbs of Kogarah Bay and Beverley Park.

Kogarah has a mixture of residential, commercial and light industrial areas. It is also known for its large number of schools (including primary school, high school and tertiary education) and health care services (including two hospitals and many medical centers). The NRL side, St George Illawarra Dragons have their Sydney office based at nearby Jubilee Oval, often referred to as Kogarah Oval. Kogarah features all types of residential developments from low density detached houses, to medium density flats and high density high-rise apartments.

History

Kogarah is derived from an Aboriginal word meaning rushes or place of reeds.  It had also been written as 'Coggera', 'Cogerah' and 'Kuggerah' but the current spelling was settled when the railway line came through the area in the 1880s.

Early land grants in the area were made to John Townson (1760–1835) who received  from 1808 to 1810, centred on Hurstville and James Chandler, whose neighbouring estate was  centred on Bexley. The district provided fruit, vegetables and oysters for Sydney. In 1869, St Paul's Church of England opened on Rocky Point Road (now Princes Highway). The suburb grew around the church and the Gardeners Arms Hotel. Kogarah became a municipality in 1885.

The former neighborhood of Moorefield is now part of Kogarah. It was originally a  land grant from Governor Lachlan Macquarie in 1812 to Patrick Moore, who built a fine house there. The Moorefield racecourse built by a descendant opened in 1888. Brigadier General John Lamrock CB VD was appointed secretary of the Moorefield Race Club in 1912 and remained in that position until early in 1935. The Moorefield estate was subdivided in the 1950s and the Department of Education purchased , where it built two high schools and college of further education. Moorefields Girls High School was erected there in 1955 on the former site of Moore's farm.

Heritage listings
Kogarah has a number of heritage-listed sites, including:
 Toomevara Lane: Toomevara Lane Chinese Market Gardens

Population

Demographics

According to the 2021 Australian Bureau of Statistics Census of Population, there were 16,416 people in Kogarah. 36.3% of people were born in Australia. The next most common countries of birth were Nepal 11.3%, China 8.2%, India 6.0%, the Philippines 3.9% and Bangladesh 2.9%. 30.4% of people only spoke English at home. Other languages spoken at home included Nepali 11.6%, Mandarin 7.8%, Cantonese 5.3%, Greek 4.8% and Bengali 3.7%. The most common responses for religious affiliation were No Religion 22.7%, Catholic 17.8%, Hinduism 16.8% and Eastern Orthodox 9.5%.

Notable residents
 Dave Brownrugby league star of the 1930s was born in Kogarah
 Ray Burtonan internationally acclaimed musician, singer and songwriter
 Rev Dr Rowland Crouchertheologian and author, lived in Warialda Street in the early years of married life while he was a staffworker with the InterVarsity Fellowship. His wife Jan taught at Kogarah High School
 Reg Gasnierrugby league legend lived in Kogarah
 Clive Jameswriter, poet, essayist, critic and commentator on popular culture was born and raised in Kogarah
 Ronald Sharpa notable Australian organ builder was born in Kogarah
 Kenneth Slessorone of Australia's greatest poets, attended Kogarah Primary School, in the early 20th century. The family lived in Belgrave Street, according to his biographer, Geoffrey Dutton
 Steve Smith former captain of Australia national cricket team, was born and raised in Kogarah
 Brandon Wakehamrugby league player, was born and raised in Kogarah

Schools and churches

Schools
Kogarah Public School
Kogarah High School 
James Cook Boys Technology High School 
Moorefield Girls High School
St Declan’s Catholic Primary School
St George Girls High School 
St Patrick's Primary School (co-ed)
Marist College Kogarah (boys, secondary)
Sydney Institute of TAFE: St. George Campus

Churches
Resurrection of Christ Greek Orthodox Church
Grace Chinese Christian Church
Kogarah Soldiers' Memorial Presbyterian Church (Kirkplace)
St Patrick's Catholic Church
St Paul's Anglican Church
Christ Church St George (Anglican), and Church in the Bank (Anglican)
Christ Living Church (Indonesian Church)
Kogarah Uniting Church

References

External links

 Georges River Council website
 Bayside Council website
 Kogarah Marist High School
 St George Girls High School
2001 Census Information

 
Suburbs of Sydney
1885 establishments in Australia
Populated places established in 1885